Rosoman is a municipality in central North Macedonia. Rosoman is also the name of the village where the municipal seat is found. Rosoman Municipality is part of the Vardar Statistical Region.

Geography
The municipality borders Gradsko Municipality to the north, Negotino Municipality to the east, Čaška Municipality to the west, and Kavadarci Municipality to the south.

Demographics
The municipality has a population of 4,141 according to the last national census in 2002, with density of 31,16 people/km². In the census in 1994, 4,328 people were registered as residents of this municipality. Ethnic groups in the municipality:
Macedonians = 3,694 (89.2%)
Serbs = 409 (9.9%)
others = 38 (0.9%)

Inhabited places
The municipality is completely rural, meaning that all the inhabited places within are villages. There are 10 inhabited places.

References

External links
 Official website

 
Vardar Statistical Region
Municipalities of North Macedonia